Jerry Maurice Reese (born March 18, 1973) is a former American football wide receiver in the National Football League who played for the Buffalo Bills. He played college football for the San Jose State Spartans. He also played in Arena Football League for the San Jose SaberCats.

References

1973 births
Living people
American football wide receivers
Buffalo Bills players
San Jose SaberCats players
San Jose State Spartans football players